Divan-i-Albisa (Diwan-i-Albisa) is a 15th-century Persian language manuscript authored by Nizam al-Din Mahmud Qari of Yazd. Divan-i-Albisa is a collection of poems about clothes. It suggests on the origins of textiles and their importation into Persian markets from "Asia (Rum), Cathay (Khita), and Hindustan".

See also 

 Salu (cloth)
 Diwan (poetry)

References

Further reading 
 Divan-i-Albisa

Persian literature
Persian poems